United Nations Security Council resolution 1171, adopted unanimously on 5 June 1998, after recalling resolutions 1132 (1997), 1156 (1998) and 1162 (1998) on the situation in Sierra Leone, the council, acting under Chapter VII of the United Nations Charter, terminated the arms embargo against the Government of Sierra Leone.

The Security Council welcomed the efforts of the Sierra Leone government to restore peace and security in the country, including the democratic process and national reconciliation. It deplored resistance to the government by rebels and demanded that they put an end to their resistance and lay down their arms.

Acting under Chapter VII of the United Nations Charter, the Council terminated the arms embargo against the government. It decided to continue to prevent the sale of weapons and materiel to non-governmental forces by requesting all states to continue to prohibit sales of weapons to Sierra Leone except through named points of entry. The restrictions would also not apply to the Economic Community of West African States Monitoring Group (ECOMOG) peacekeeping force or United Nations personnel.

The resolution then imposed a travel ban on leading members of the former military junta and Revolutionary United Front. All measures would be terminated once the authority of the Sierra Leone government was restored in the country and all non-governmental forces were disarmed and demobilised.  Finally, the Secretary-General was requested to report within three and six months since the adoption of the current resolution regarding the sanctions and progress made by the Government of Sierra Leone and non-governmental forces.

See also
 History of Sierra Leone
 List of United Nations Security Council Resolutions 1101 to 1200 (1997–1998)
 Sierra Leone Civil War

References

External links
 
Text of the Resolution at undocs.org

 1171
1998 in Sierra Leone
Sierra Leone Civil War
 1171
United Nations Security Council sanctions regimes
June 1998 events